Nimtala Crematorium is located on Beadon Street, Kolkata, India. The crematorium is also historically known as Nimtala burning ghat, or simply Nimtala ghat. Located on the banks of Hoogly (Ganga)  it is considered to be one of the holiest burning ghats in the country where the soul is said to attain moksha , ie. breaking the cycle of birth and death. So people across the country comes here for the cremation of their loved ones. It is also one of the largest burning ghats in the country, being located in Kolkata.

History 
The first building of this burning ghat came up in 1717, but cremation was done almost 2000 years before that time. In 2010 the central government of India upgraded the crematorium at a cost of INR ₹140 million (US$2.0 million). The Bengali polymath Rabindranath Tagore was cremated here in 1941. The Rabindranath Tagore Memorial in the crematorium compound was beautified as part of the 2010 project.

The ghat has also been represented in popular literature. It plays a significant part in the plot of the 2013 Kerala Sahitya Akademi Award winning Malayalam novel, Aarachaar, by K. R. Meera.

Notable funerals 
 Iswar Chandra Vidyasagar
 Rabindranath Tagore
 Rajendralal Mitra
 Manik Bandopadhyay

See also 
 Kashi Mitra Ghat crematorium
 Keoratola crematorium

References

External links
 

Crematoria in India
Culture of Kolkata
Death in India
Ghats in Kolkata